Neptis cartica, the plain sailer, is a species of nymphalid butterfly found in South Asia.

Subspecies
Neptis cartica cartica (Nepal, Sikkim, Bhutan, Assam, northern Burma, northern Vietnam)
Neptis cartica burmana de Nicéville, 1886 (southern Burma, northern Thailand)
Neptis cartica pagoda Yoshino, 1997 (Yunnan)

References

cartica
Butterflies of Indochina
Butterflies described in 1872